Percy Grainger Home and Studio is a historic home located at White Plains, Westchester County, New York. It was built in 1893 and is a two-story, three-bay-wide dwelling with a pyramidal hipped roof in the American Foursquare style. It features a full-width, one-story porch supported by four Doric order columns. The main entrance is a Dutch door.  It was the home of musician Percy Grainger from 1921 to his death in 1961.

It was added to the National Register of Historic Places in 1993.

See also
National Register of Historic Places listings in southern Westchester County, New York

References

External links 

 Percy Grainger Society

Houses on the National Register of Historic Places in New York (state)
American Foursquare architecture in New York (state)
Houses completed in 1893
Houses in Westchester County, New York
Buildings and structures in White Plains, New York
National Register of Historic Places in Westchester County, New York